Lewis V. Morgan, Jr. (December 17, 1929 – October 4, 2018) was an American lawyer, judge, and politician.

Morgan was born in Elmhurst, Illinois. He lived with his family in Wheaton, Illinois and graduated from Wheaton High School. He served in the United States Army and was stationed in Germany. Morgan received his bachelor's degree from DePauw University in 1951 and his Juris Doctor degree from the University of Chicago Law School in 1954. Morgan was admitted to the Illinois bar and practiced law in Wheaton, Illinois. Morgan served in the Illinois House of Representatives from 1963 to 1970 and was a Republican. Morgan then served as an Illinois associate judge and as an Illinois circuit judge from 1975 to 1986. Morgan died in Wheaton, Illinois.

Notes

1929 births
2018 deaths
People from Elmhurst, Illinois
People from Wheaton, Illinois
Military personnel from Illinois
DePauw University alumni
University of Chicago Law School alumni
Illinois lawyers
Illinois state court judges
Republican Party members of the Illinois House of Representatives
20th-century American judges
20th-century American lawyers